Qatar University Library serves students, faculty, staff, and researchers at Qatar University in Qatar. It was constructed in 1973.

It operates two separate facilities: the women’s library facility, a four-storey building with a total area of 1,200 square metres, and the men’s library facility, a two-storey building with an area of 3,000 square metres. There are also two American Corners in the library. As of 2013, the library director was Imad Bechir.

References

External links

Libraries in Qatar
Qatar University